Raj Kiran Mahtani (born 19 June 1949) is a former Indian actor who is recognised for his work in Bollywood. Born in a Sindhi family in Bombay, he made his debut opposite Sarika in B. R. Ishara's Kaagaz Ki Nao (1975) and achieved the crest of his career in the 1980s, having appeared in more than 100 films.

Throughout his career, he accepted leading as well as supporting roles. He was loved for his leading roles in films such as Kaagaz Ki Nao (1975), Shikshaa (1979), Maan Abhiman (1980) and Ek Naya Rishta (1988) as well as being appreciated for his supporting roles in films such as Karz (1980), Baseraa (1981), Arth (1982),  Raaj Tilak (1984), and Waaris (1988) to name a few. He was often typecasted as a romantic as well as kind-hearted hero.

He disappeared from the industry and was thought to be living as a recluse in the United States for many years. Rishi Kapoor was reportedly told by Gobind Mahtani, the brother of Raj Kiran that the actor was in Atlanta in an asylum where he was living due to a mental illness. In 2011, his daughter issued a public statement negating the reports of Raj Kiran being found in Atlanta. She and her family have been looking for him with the assistance of New York police and private detectives for years.

Career
Raj Kiran made his debut opposite Sarika in B. R. Ishara's Kaagaz Ki Nao (1975) and had the major flow in his career in the 1980s. In 1980, he hit the theatre with his successive eight releases – Karz, Bambai Ka Maharaja, Maan Abhiman, Manokamnaa, Nazrana Pyar Ka, Patita, Saajan Mere Main Saajan Ki and Yeh Kaisa Insaaf.

Throughout his career, he accepted leading as well as supporting roles. He was loved for his leading roles in films such as Kaagaz Ki Nao (1975), Shikshaa (1979), Maan Abhiman (1980) and Ek Naya Rishta (1988) as well as appreciated for his supporting roles in films such as Karz (1980), Baseraa (1981), Arth (1982) and Raaj Tilak (1984) to name a few.

He was often typecasted as a romantic as well as kind hearted hero which was considered as his most loved image by viewers. Sometimes his roles were apparently flawed but at the end they turned out to be generous. His role as Gopal in Justice Chaudhury (1983) abandons his wife to blackmail his father-in-law, but it is later revealed that he has been trapped into doing so. In his role as the womanizer and alcoholic businessman Rajiv Tandon in Ek Naya Rishta (1988) he falls in love with a sex worker and marries her.

Since the beginning of 1990s, his career began to slow down. Further, he made his television debut in the Shekhar Suman starrer, much acclaimed TV series Reporter (1994).

Disappearance
Raj Kiran went into acute depression after his career had taken a backseat. Reportedly, the actor also went through a series of domestic crises. Later, he was admitted to Byculla Mental asylum in Mumbai. He disappeared from the industry and was thought to be living as a recluse in America for many years. Deepti Naval endeavoured to look for the missing actor through Facebook writing on her timeline, "Looking for a friend from the film world his name is Raj Kiran – we have no news of him – last heard he was driving a cab in NY city if anyone has any clue, please tell . . ."

In June, 2011, Rishi Kapoor, on a trip to the United States made a phone call to the missing actor's brother Gobind Mahtani, who told him that the actor was in Atlanta in an asylum where he was living due to a mental illness. He refused to give any more details.

In 2011, his daughter Rishika issued a public statement negating the reports of Raj Kiran being found in Atlanta. She and her family have been looking for him with the assistance of New York police and private detectives for years.

Filmography
 Kaagaz Ki Nao (1975) 
 Kissa Kursi Ka (1977)
 Shikshaa (1979)
 Patita (1980)
 Karz (1980)
 Manokaamnaa (1980)
 Maan Abhimaan (1980)
 Yeh Kaisa Insaf (1980)
 Nakhuda (1981)
 Bulundi (1981)
 Baseraa (1981)
 Josh (1981) 
 Kaaran (1981)
 Khara Khota (1981) 
 Bezubaan (1982)
 Arth (1982)
 Star (1982)
 Sun Meri Laila (1983)
 Mazdoor (1983)
 Ghar Ek Mandir (1984)
 Raaj Tilak (1984)
 Hip Hip Hurray (1984)
 Aaj Ka Daur (1985)
 Ghar Dwaar (1985)
 Faasle (1985)
 Arjun (1985)
 Teri Meherbaniyan (1985)
 Ilzaam (1986)
 Ghar Ka Sukh (1987)
 Woh Din Aayenga (1987)
 Mard Ki Zabaan (1987)
 Goraa (1987)
 Manu The Great (1987)
 Pyar Ka Mandir (1988)
 Ek Hi Maqsad (1988)
 Bahaar (1988)
 Waaris  (1988)
 Ek Naya Rishta (1988) 
 Waaris (1988)
 Waqt Ke Zanjeer (1989)
 Ghar Ho To Aisa (1990)
 Police Public (1990)
 Pyar Ka Devta (1991)
 Karz Chukana Hai (1991)
 Zakhmi Rooh (1993)
 Chudail No. 1 (1999)
 Akeli (2014)

Television
 Reporter (1994)
 Aakhir Kaun (1996)
 Aahat (1997–98)

See also

List of people who disappeared

References

External links

 NDTV on Raj Kiran

1949 births
2000s missing person cases
20th-century Indian male actors
American people of Sindhi descent
Indian male film actors
Male actors from Mumbai
Male actors in Hindi cinema
Missing people
Missing person cases in India
Sindhi people